Sir George Gustavus Walker KCB JP DL (18 January 1830 – 5 August 1897) was a Conservative Member of Parliament (MP).

The son of John Walker, of Crawfordton, and his wife, Jessy, he was educated at Rugby School and Balliol College, Oxford.  He was the Conservative MP for Dumfriesshire, elected at the 1865 general election. He lost to Liberal Sydney Waterlow at the 1868 general election, but regained his seat at a by-election in 1869 owing to the disqualification of Waterlow when he became a government contractor.  Walker stepped down at the 1874 general election.  John Hope-Johnstone (1842–1912) subsequently won the seat for the Tories.  He was appointed KCB in 1892.

He married Anne Murray Lennock, only daughter of Admiral George Gustavus Lennock.  They had one daughter, Ethel Mary Walker, who married the Liberal politician Edward Knatchbull-Hugessen, 1st Baron Brabourne.

References

External links
 

1831 births
1897 deaths
Scottish Tory MPs (pre-1912)
People educated at Rugby School
Alumni of Balliol College, Oxford
Members of the Parliament of the United Kingdom for Scottish constituencies
UK MPs 1865–1868
UK MPs 1868–1874